Wikstroemia is a genus of 55-70 species of flowering shrubs and small trees in the mezereon family, Thymelaeaceae. Hawaiian species are known by the common name ‘ākia.

Medicinal uses
Wikstroemia indica is one of the 50 fundamental herbs used in traditional Chinese medicine.

Paper making
The bark fibres of several species of Wikstroemia are used to make paper.

Species
Wikstroemia albiflora
Wikstroemia alternifolia
Wikstroemia angustifolia
Wikstroemia australis  – Norfolk Island
Wikstroemia balansae
Wikstroemia bicornuta Hillebr. – alpine false ohelo (Lānai and  Maui, Hawaii)
Wikstroemia chuii
Wikstroemia coriacea Sol. ex Seem.
Wikstroemia elliptica
Wikstroemia forbesii Skottsb. – Molokai false ohelo (Molokai, Hawaii)
Wikstroemia fruticosa
Wikstroemia furcata (Hillebr.) Rock – forest false ohelo (Kauai, Hawaii)
Wikstroemia ganpi
Wikstroemia gracilis
Wikstroemia hainanensis
Wikstroemia hanalei Wawra – lavafield false ohelo (Kauai, Hawaii)
Wikstroemia indica  – NT, Qld, NSW, Australia
Wikstroemia johnplewsii - Marquesas Islands 
Wikstroemia lanceolata
Wikstroemia liangii
Wikstroemia ligustrina
Wikstroemia linearifolia
Wikstroemia linoides 
Wikstroemia longipaniculata
Wikstroemia micrantha
Wikstroemia monnula
Wikstroemia mononectaria
Wikstroemia monticola Skottsb. – Ākia, montane false ohelo (Maui)
Wikstroemia nutans
Wikstroemia oahuensis A.Gray – Oahu false ohelo (Kauai, Oahu, Molokai, Lānai, and Maui in Hawaii)
Wikstroemia oahuensis var. oahuensis – Oahu false ohelo
Wikstroemia oahuensis var. palustris – Oahu false ohelo
Wikstroemia ovata
Wikstroemia pampaninii
Wikstroemia parviflora
Wikstroemia pauciflora
Wikstroemia paxiana
Wikstroemia phillyreifolia A.Gray – Hawaii false ohelo (Island of Hawaii)
Wikstroemia polyantha
Wikstroemia pulcherrima Skottsb. – Kohala false ohelo (Island of Hawaii)
Wikstroemia retusa
Wikstroemia ridleyi
Wikstroemia rosmarinifolia
Wikstroemia sandwicensis Meisn. – variableleaf false ohelo (Island of Hawaii)
Wikstroemia scytophylla
Wikstroemia sikokiana
Wikstroemia stenophylla
Wikstroemia trichotoma
Wikstroemia skottsbergiana† Sparre – Skottsberg's false ohelo (Kauai, Hawaii)
Wikstroemia souliei
Wikstroemia taiwanensis
Wikstroemia techinensis
Wikstroemia tenuiramis
Wikstroemia uva-ursi A.Gray – hillside false ohelo (Kauai, Oahu, Molokai, and Maui in Hawaii)
Wikstroemia uva-ursi var. kauaiensis – false ohelo
Wikstroemia uva-ursi var. uva-ursi – hillside false ohelo
Wikstroemia villosa Hillebr. – hairy false ohelo (Maui, Hawaii)

References

 
Medicinal plants
Malvales genera